Ali Saad (Arabic: علي سعد) is a Lebanese actor and voice actor.

Filmography

Film 

Princess of Rome - Voice only. 2015
Magic Bottle - Voice only. 2016
Karun Treasure - Voice only. 2016

Television

Dubbing roles 
 A Bug's Life - Hopper (Classical Arabic version)
 Atlantis: Milo's Return (Classical Arabic version)
 Atlantis: The Lost Empire - Commander Lyle Tiberius Rourke (Classical Arabic version)
 Dexter's Laboratory
 The Men of Angelos
 WALL-E - M-O and John (Classical Arabic version)
 Princess of Rome
 Prophet Joseph - Malik ibn Zaar
 Kick Buttowski: Suburban Daredevil - Harold Buttowski (Classical Arabic Version)

References

External links 

 

Lebanese male actors
Lebanese male television actors
21st-century Lebanese male actors
Lebanese male voice actors
Year of birth missing (living people)
Living people
Place of birth missing (living people)